Robert Pelikán (born 18 October 1979) is a Czech lawyer and politician who served as Minister of Justice from 2015 to 2018.

Biography

Legal career pre-politics
Pelikán studied at the Faculty of Law of the Charles University in Prague. He began his professional career in 2002 as a Junior Associate at the Císař, Češka, Smutný and Co. law firm. After completing a six-month professional internship at the General Court of the European Union in Luxembourg in 2006 and passing the Bar exam in 2007, Pelikán joined the international law firm Linklaters, where he practised as an Attorney until 2009. In the same year he co-founded the Vrána & Pelikán law firm, where he was also a partner until 2014, when he left the firm, sold his share in Vrána & Pelikán and had his attorney practice suspended, before entering the state administration.

Pelikán's fields as an attorney were competition, corporate and civil law, as well as dispute resolution.

Political career
After the 2013 elections Pelikán joined the Czech Ministry of Finance as the Legal Section Director. A few months later, in June 2014, he became the First Deputy Minister of Justice, and on 12 March 2015 he was appointed the sixteenth Minister of Justice of the Czech Republic, succeeding Helena Válková. 

After the 2017 elections Pelikán also served as a member of the Czech Chamber of Deputies, presided over the Legislation Council of the Czech Government, and was responsible for the coordination of the human rights and equal opportunities agenda.

On 7 April 2018, Pelikán announced that he would leave politics and resign from all executive posts, citing the significant differences of opinion between himself and his party. He remained in the post until 27 June 2018, when a new government was appointed.

Post-political career
Following the end of his political career, he returned to advocacy. In October 2018 Robert Pelikán joined the international law firm Wolf Theiss as a Counsel and a member of the newly-established regional Corporate Investigations practice.

Pelikán is also active in academia. Since 2004 he has been an Associate of the Department of Civil Rights of the Faculty of Law at Charles University, and in 2012 he started lecturing at the faculty's Department of Commercial Law.

He regularly publishes articles in professional journals, teaches at university and participates in various conferences. In 2014 he co-authored the Commentary to the Civil Code and in 2010 he published a two-part commentary to the Act on Transformations of Commercial Companies and Cooperatives.

References 

1979 births
Justice ministers of the Czech Republic
Charles University alumni
Living people
ANO 2011 Government ministers
21st-century Czech lawyers
Politicians from Prague
Members of the Chamber of Deputies of the Czech Republic (2017–2021)